{{DISPLAYTITLE:C7H5Br3O}} 
The molecular formula C7H5Br3O (molar mass: 344.83 g/mol, exact mass: 341.7891 u) may refer to: 

 2,4,6-Tribromoanisole (TBA)
 Tribromometacresol